Yang is the transcription of a Chinese family name. It is the sixth most common surname in Mainland China. It is the 16th surname on the Hundred Family Surnames text.

The Yang clan was founded by Boqiao, son of Duke Wu of Jin in the Spring and Autumn Period of the Ji (姬) surname, the surname of the royal family during the Zhou dynasty ) who was enfeoffed in the state of Yang.

History
The German sociologist Wolfram Eberhard calls Yang the "Monkey Clan", citing the totemistic myth recorded in the Soushenji and Fayuan Zhulin that the Yangs living in southwestern Shu (modern Sichuan) were descendants of monkeys.  The Soushenji "reported that in the southwest of Shu there were monkey-like animals whose names were jiaguo (猳國), mahua (馬化), or jueyuan (玃猿). These animals abducted women and sent them back when they became pregnant. If the baby were not accepted, the woman would have to die. Therefore these children were raised and they received the clan name the Yang surname. For this reason this clan occurred quite frequently in Southwest Shu."

Emperor of Hua Xia System

Direct descendants of Huang Di of Hua Xia include descendants of Yellow Emperor and Chiyou during Xia Dynasty, also many sons and grandsons of Yu the Great, have taken Yang as surname, some of its sub-domains are the prominent Yang Jian of Zhou which take role as a Heavenly Marshal take his colony to seek peace after Zhou Dynasty win and erected his colony peacefully. And also Yang Ren is known through the title of Grand Counselor. Which appear at Fengshen Yanyi or Investiture of the Gods, novel accordingly to the historical founding of Zhou Dynasty.

Korean System

Descendants of Yang Eulna (楊乙那), the first historical ancestor of the Jeju's Yang clan was a Shilla figure, but according to another source, his distant ancestor was one of three men who ascended from a cave on the north side of Cheju Island’s Halla Mountain, Jeju’s Tamnagook kingdom who built the Yang Clan there.

Renaming System

The Yang clan was founded by Boqiao (伯僑) and later become Yang Boqiao (楊伯僑) with Yang, as usual ducal courtesy name, son of Duke Wu of Jin in the Spring and Autumn period of the Ji (姬) surname, the surname of the royal family during the Zhou dynasty (c. 8th to 5th centuries BC) who was enfeoffed a vast land, the state of Yang, with its central in at ancient's Shaanxi. This name was derived from Yangshe (羊舌) literally “sheep’s tongue”. During the Warring States period (403–221 BC) his descendants fled to escape destruction by the conquering the Qin, and simplified their surname to Yang.

Yang clan of Hongnong refer to themselves as "Yang of the Hall of Four Wisdoms (楊四知)". The "Hall of Four Wisdoms (四知堂)" refers to a story concerning Yang Zhen (楊震), an official of the Eastern Han Dynasty (206 BC - 220 AD), and known for his erudition as well as moral character. When a man named Wang Mi (王密) visited Yang Zhen at night and attempted to bribe him 10 catties of gold, Yang rejected the gift. Wang Mi persevered, saying that nobody would know. Yang Zhen famously retorted "Heaven knows, Earth knows, you know and I know.  How can you say that nobody would know?" Descendants of Yang Zhen adopted the "four wisdoms", or "Si Zhi (四知)" as the title of their clan hall. Some Yang family clan halls in various parts of China still carry this name.

Translation of Yangs System

Homogenization of another surname pronounced Yang join into the Yang surname, written with a "hand" radical rather than the "wood" radical. The two characters were used interchangeably in ancient times. The Yang surname members adopted many local sounding and customizable Western style or another language beside Mandarin Chinese surnames with even neutralization name and changes rapidly through generations, but some still preserved Mandarin Chinese character name as secondary name beside the legal name, and appear a lot in some countries like Laos, Thailand, Philippines, Indonesia, Malaysia, India, etc. 
Some examples of it are Karen and other names at Thailand. Yang is most often the transliteration of the character 楊. The same character can also mean a type of poplar. The character is composed of a "wood" radical mu (木) on the left and the character yi/yang (昜) on the right, which indicates the pronunciation of the whole character.

Lineage
This is current asserted prevalent lineage for the Yang surname prior to Boqiao:

Huangdi (黃帝) -> Shaohao (少昊) -> Emperor Ku (帝喾) -> Hou Ji (后稷) -> Gugong Danfu (古公亶父) -> King Wen of Zhou (周文王) -> King Wu of Zhou (周武王) -> Shu Yu of Tang (唐叔虞) -> Marquis Mu of Jin (晉穆侯) -> Zhuang Bo of Quwo (曲沃莊伯) -> Duke Wu of Jin (晉武公) -> Boqiao (伯僑) -> Yang Shíwo (杨食我)

Polities ruled by Yang families
 Yang state of the Zhou dynasty
 Chouchi
 Sui dynasty
 Yang Wu
 Kokang
 Tamna 
 Taiping Heavenly Kingdom (East) 
 Giao Chỉ Dương Đình Nghệ 
 Đại Việt 
 Annam Dương Tam Kha
 Jonê County
 Bozhou
 Great Yining
 The Pacified Southern Kingdom
 Legendary Champa Queenship (female)
 VI, VII, VIII, IX Champa Dynasties
 Lulong Circuit Yang Zhicheng 
 Tĩnh Hải quân (independent) Dương Thanh
 Kauthara Yan Pu Nagara (female)
 Haixi Jurchens chieftains Yangginu of Yehe or Yehe Nara Clan
 Hoa People Dương Ngạn Địch
 Anti-Qing Dynasty Yang Fuqing
 Jin Guo Shandong Yang Miaozhen (female)
 Jin Guo Shandong Yang An'er
 Eastern Tujue Sui Guowang Yang Zhengdao
 Northern Dynasty Yang Lie
 Majapahit Empire Yang-wi-si-sa and Nyoo Lay Wa
 New King Buddha III Liang Daomingguo Yang Xin
 White Wave Bandits Yang Feng
 Hunan the Great Sage Heavenly King Yang Yao
 Shannan West Circuit Yang Shouliang
 Chiefdom of Leipo
 Xiushan Yang Clan Tusi

See also
Young (surname)
Yang (Korean surname)
Duong (Surname)
Chinese surname
Generals of the Yang Family

References

External links
Chinese surname history: Yang
杨氏寻根网: Yang

Chinese-language surnames
Korean-language surnames
Individual Chinese surnames